No, After You Sir... is a compilation album by Australian rock band You Am I, released in 2003. The album was released in the United Kingdom only.

Track listing
"Junk"
"Minor Byrd"
"Good Mornin'"
"The Applecross Wing Commander"
"Hourly Daily"
"Mr. Milk" (Single Version)
"Cathy's Clown"
"Handwasher"
"Soldiers"
"Wally Raffles"
"Fifteen"
"Heavy Heart"
"Billy"
"Berlin Chair" (Live)
"Get Up"
"Ain’t Gone & Open"
"Cool Hand Luke"

References

You Am I albums
2003 compilation albums